Melvin Lamont McCants (born August 19, 1967) is an American retired basketball player. Along with James Farr, Derek Boyd and Chris Calloway, McCants led Chicago's Mount Carmel to the 1985 Illinois state basketball championship. It is the only Illinois AA high school boys basketball championship won by a Chicago Catholic League School. He was selected to the 1982 and 1983 State Farm Holiday Classic all-tournament teams.

After high school, McCants attended Purdue University, located in West Lafayette, Indiana, to play under legendary coach Gene Keady. Along with teammates Troy Lewis and Todd Mitchell, the forward helped the Boilermakers win back-to-back Big Ten Conference titles and NCAA Tournament appearances, including a Sweet Sixteen in 1988. McCants played with the Los Angeles Lakers during the 1989–90 season.

External links
NBA stats @ basketballreference.com

1967 births
Living people
American men's basketball players
Los Angeles Lakers players
Purdue Boilermakers men's basketball players
Sioux Falls Skyforce (CBA) players
Small forwards
Undrafted National Basketball Association players
Basketball players from Chicago